Jane is a surname, related to the given name Jane, which is ultimately derived from the Hebrew name , , meaning "Graced by Yahweh".

People with this surname
  
 Bob Jane (1929-2018), Australian race car driver and prominent entrepreneur and business tycoon
 Cory Jane (born 1983), New Zealand rugby union footballer
 Fred T. Jane (1865–1916), author and publisher
 Jesse Jane (born 1980), American pornographic actress and model, pseudonym of Cindy Taylor
 Joseph Jane (died 1660), British politician
 Thomas Jane (born 1969), actor

Fictional characters
 Patrick Jane (born 1974), main character in The Mentalist

See also 
 Jain (surname)
 Janes
 Jayne
 Jaynes

Surnames